Radean Robinson (born 9 September 1998) is a Italy international rugby league footballer who plays as a  or  for the Souths Logan Magpies in the Queensland Cup.

He previously played for the Central Queensland Capras in the Queensland Cup.

Background
Robinson was born in Rockhampton, Queensland, Australia. He is of Italian and Indigenous Australian descent.

Playing career

Club career
From 2020 to 2022 Robinson played in 35 games, and scored 11 tries for the Central Queensland Capras in the Queensland Cup. In late 2022, he signed a train and trial deal with the Dolphins for the 2023 NRL season. However it was later announced by Souths Logan Magpies, he would be joining them instead for the 2023 Queensland Cup season.

International career
In 2022 Robinson was named in the Italy squad for the 2021 Rugby League World Cup.

References

External links
Central Queensland Capras profile
Italy profile

1998 births
Living people
Australian rugby league players
Australian people of Italian descent
Italy national rugby league team players
Indigenous Australian rugby league players
Rugby league five-eighths
Rugby league players from Queensland